Instruments of Torture is the debut album by the death metal band Brodequin.

Track listing
 "Spinning In Agony" – 02:35
 "Soothsayer" – 02:33
 "Ambrosia" – 02:01
 "The Virgin Of Nuremberg" – 03:40
 "Duke Of Exeter" – 02:30
 "Infested With Worms" – 02:41
 "Burnt In Effigy" – 02:12
 "Strappado" – 02:58
 "Hollow" – 01:50
 "Feast Of Flesh" – 02:03

2000 debut albums
Brodequin albums